The BlackBerry Classic, originally known as the BlackBerry Q20, is a touchscreen-based smartphone with a physical QWERTY, AZERTY or QWERTZ keyboard developed by BlackBerry, previously known as RIM (Research In Motion). The BlackBerry Classic was unveiled on December 17, 2014, and it runs the BlackBerry 10 operating system. Its design is similar to the BlackBerry Q10 in form and feel and especially to the BlackBerry Bold 9900 and related lines in that they feature an optical trackpad which can complement or be used as primary means of navigation instead of or with the device's touch-screen.

Specifications

Hardware
The BlackBerry Classic has a square 3.5-inch 720×720 IPS AMLCD Display, it sports a dual-core 1.5 GHz Krait Qualcomm Snapdragon S4 Plus processor, 2 GB of RAM, and 16 GB of internal storage, which can be expanded up to 256 GB using a microSD card. The phone has a non-removable 2515 mAh Li-Ion battery, an 8 MP rear camera with LED flash, and a 2 MP front-facing camera with auto-focus. The device is available in multiple colours, Black, White, and Blue.

Software
BlackBerry Classic ships with BlackBerry OS 10.3.1 and is upgradable to 10.3.3.

Reception 
The BlackBerry Classic received generally positive reviews from critics, with average ratings of 7/10. TechRadar gave a 3.5/5 score, praising the speed of the web browser and messaging services, but expressing disappointment toward a lack of apps and the phone's physical weight.

Sales
In March 2015, financial firm Morgan Stanley issued a report claiming both the BlackBerry Passport and Classic were "not selling" and that only 8,000 units combined were sold in that financial quarter. According to The Guardian, general sales had reached $793 million, which was below BlackBerry's $927 million expectations.

On July 5, 2016, BlackBerry announced that it would cease production of the Classic globally. This ignited speculation that the Classic had been the last BlackBerry with a physical keyboard and with BlackBerry 10. However, on July 26, 2016, the company hinted that another model with a traditional keyboard was "coming shortly". Previously, COO Marty Beard had debunked the rumours about the end of BlackBerry 10.

See also 
List of BlackBerry 10 devices

References

External links 

 

Classic
Mobile phones introduced in 2014
Discontinued smartphones
Mobile phones with an integrated hardware keyboard